Shelly Kappe (born 1928 in Philadelphia, Pennsylvania) is an architectural historian and academic who specializes in the residential history of Los Angeles.  She was a founding member of the faculty at the Southern California Institute of Architecture (SCI-Arc), an independent school of architecture created in 1972.

Education
Shelly graduated from the University of California at Los Angeles. She earned a master's degree in Architectural History from the Southern California Institute of Architecture.

Work
As a writer, Shelly Kappe focused academic attention on the modernist architects working in Los Angeles in the 1940s-1970s through articles in Architecture California and LA Architect magazines. Shelly has been the editor of Environmental Design West and has written about the history of environmental design.  In 1985, she was a member of the editorial board of Architecture California, the journal of the AIA/California Council.

In addition to her role as a faculty member at SCI-ARC, Shelly Kappe was “instrumental in establishing and coordinating…” the school's Design Forum Public Lecture Program, “…which featured prominent figures in national and international design and architecture…”.  In 1977, 12 Los Angeles architects (including Frank Gehry and Kappe's husband, Raymond Kappe) came together to exhibit their work for the first time as a group. Shelly Kappe contributed videotaped interviews used in conjunction with the photo exhibition of L.A. 12 work at the Pacific Design Center and an associated two-day seminar.

Shelly Kappe served as inaugural director of the Architecture Gallery at SCI-ARC, for which she curated 8 exhibits.  Among them are the 1981 inaugural exhibit, Modern Architecture: Mexico  (for which Kappe authored the catalog) and an exhibit of work by Finnish architect Alvar Aalto entitled The Mystery of Form.

References

Living people
1928 births
Architectural historians
University of California, Los Angeles alumni
Southern California Institute of Architecture alumni